Harold Alfred Denham (13 October 1872 – 25 February 1946) was a British Army officer and an English first-class cricketer. Denham was a right-handed batsman.

Denham represented Hampshire in one first-class match in 1896 against Sussex.

He was commissioned as a second lieutenant in the King's (Liverpool Regiment) on 21 October 1893, promoted to lieutenant on 18 July 1896, and to captain on 21 March 1900.

Denham died in Wilmington, Sussex on 25 February 1946.

References

External links
Harold Denham at Cricinfo
Harold Denham at CricketArchive

1872 births
1946 deaths
People from Howrah district
People from West Bengal
English cricketers
Hampshire cricketers
British Army personnel of the Second Boer War
King's Regiment (Liverpool) officers